African-American Women for Reproductive Freedom was an American-based reproductive rights organization that formed in 1990. The organization developed as a way for African American women to show support for "Jane Roe" (Norma Leah Nelson McCorvey) in Roe vs. Wade. Faye Wattleton was one of the first major supporters of the organization. 

This group's intent was to alter the perception of abortion not being a choice for African-American women, who they argued faced additional stigma and judgement for seeking out a legal abortion. Their arguments mentioned the history of rape, torture, and other forms of abuse suffered by African-American women, stating that it was not fair and that this led to them being continually marginalized and treated as if they couldn't think for themselves.

Declaration brochure
In 1989, before officially forming an organization, a group of 16 African American women, and one man, all affiliated with major organizations in the country, released a declaration brochure supporting pro-choice reproductive rights. The document, "African American Women are for Reproductive Freedom", was signed by: 

 Byllye Avery
 Willie Barrow
 Donna Brazile
 Shirley Chisholm
 Cardiss Collins
 Ramona Edelin
 Jacqui Gates
 Marcia Ann Gillespie
 Dorothy Height
 Jewel Jackson McCabe
 Julianne Malveaux
 Eleanor Holmes Norton
 C. Delores Tucker
 Patricia Tyson
 Maxine Waters
 Faye Wattleton

See also  
 Abortion in the United States

References

External links 
 A statement released by the organization as published in Ms. from Our Bodies, Our Selves.

1990 establishments in the United States
African-American women's organizations
Abortion-rights organizations in the United States
Women's organizations based in the United States
Organizations established in 1990